The FIS Alpine Ski World Cup is the top international circuit of alpine skiing competitions, launched in 1966 by a group of ski racing friends and experts which included French journalist Serge Lang and the alpine ski team directors from France (Honore Bonnet) and the USA (Bob Beattie). It was soon backed by International Ski Federation president Marc Hodler during the FIS Alpine World Ski Championships 1966 at Portillo, Chile, and became an official FIS event in the spring of 1967 after the FIS Congress at Beirut, Lebanon.

On January 5, 1967, the inaugural World Cup race was held in Berchtesgaden, West Germany, a slalom won by Heinrich Messner of Austria.  Jean-Claude Killy of France and Nancy Greene of Canada were the overall winners for the first two seasons.

Rules
Competitors attempt to achieve the best time in four disciplines: slalom, giant slalom, super G, and downhill. The fifth event, the combined, employs the downhill and slalom.  The World Cup originally included only slalom, giant slalom, and downhill races. Combined events (calculated using results from selected downhill and slalom races) were included starting with the 1974–75 season, while the Super G was added for the 1982–83 season.

The current scoring system was implemented in the 1991–92 season.  For every race points are awarded to the top 30 finishers: 100 points to the winner, 80 for second, 60 for third, winding down to 1 point for 30th place.  The racer with the most points at the end of the season in mid-March wins the cup, represented by a 9 kilogram crystal globe. Sub-prizes are also awarded in each individual race discipline, with a smaller 3.5 kg crystal globe.

The World Cup is held annually, and is considered the premier competition for alpine ski racing after the quadrennial Winter Olympics. Many consider the World Cup to be a more valuable title than the Olympics or the biennial World Championships, since it requires a competitor to ski at an extremely high level in several disciplines throughout the season, and not just in one race.

Races are hosted primarily at ski resorts in the Alps in Europe, with regular stops in Scandinavia, North America, and east Asia, but a few races have also been held in the Southern Hemisphere. World Cup competitions have been hosted in 25 countries around the world: Andorra, Argentina, Australia, Austria, Bosnia and Herzegovina, Bulgaria, Canada, Croatia, Czech Republic, Finland, France, Germany, Italy, Japan, New Zealand, Norway, Poland, Russia, Slovakia, Slovenia, South Korea, Spain, Sweden, Switzerland, and the United States.

Lower competitive circuits include the NorAm Cup in North America and the Europa Cup in Europe.

Overall winners 

Multiple individual overall World Cup winners are marked with (#).

Individual

Individual titles by country

Men overall titles 
The following skiers have at least three overall alpine World Cup titles.

Women overall titles 
The following skiers have at least three overall alpine World Cup titles.

Discipline titles

Top ten small crystal globe podiums

Men

Women

Most small globes per discipline
Combined crystal globes were officially awarded from 2007 to 2012. Here are counted all season titles, official and unofficial. The records for most World Cup titles in each discipline are as follows:

Men

Women

Men's season titles

Women's season titles

Most race wins in each discipline 
As of 16 March 2023

Men

Women

Hosts

Men's

Total

Downhill

Super-G

Giant slalom

Slalom 

Updated: 12 March 2023

Women's

Total

Downhill

Super-G

Giant slalom

Slalom

Most races won 

A common measurement of how good individual skiers are is the total number of World Cup races won during their skiing career. The following skiers have won at least 20 World Cup races:

Most Wins: men

update: 11 March 2023

Most Wins: women

Most podiums and top ten results 
As of 29 January 2023.

Career podiums

Career top ten results 

Note: Only parallel events from (1975, 1997, 2011–2013, 2016) which count for overall ranking, included on this list, are considered as official individual World Cup victories.

Greatest alpine skiers of all time 
Based on ski-database super ranking system (since 1966), this scoring system is calculated using points from three categories: Olympic Games, World Championships, and World Cup (overall titles, discipline titles and individual top ten results).

Men's super ranking

Women's super ranking

Parallel slalom 
Parallel slaloms from 1976 to 1991 counted for Nations Cup. There were no limitations regarding the number of athletes who could enter the competition, but each main event was limited to 32 competitors.

Men

Women

City event 
Parallel city event is a version of parallel slalom where only Top16 ranked are allowed to compete. Length of the track and course/gates setting are also different from classic parallel slalom, and as of 2019/20 season, they are completely replaced with normal parallel races with qualification run.

Men

Women

Parallel giant slalom 

Introduced by the International Ski Federation to the World Cup as a spectator-friendly event in late 2015, the parallel giant slalom competition, or shortened parallel-G, joining the parallel slalom, is intended to lure more speed specialists into the faster of the two technical disciplines, along with attracting their fans to watch the races at the venue, on-line, and on television. Few venues offer the slope and conditions required to host an extremely short Giant Slalom course that can be readily viewed in its entirety by a compact gallery of fans. Modified or not, the Federation has not suggested that they will push the format to lower-level tours like the NorAm and Europa Cup.

Format 
The Chief Race Director of the inaugural event at Alta Badia, Markus Waldner, on 20 December 2015 stated that "great performances" and "head-to-head fights" between the best Giant Slalom racers is the goal of the competition. The course for the first race was very compact at about 20–22 seconds duration, or about one-third of a normal GS run. The pace and cadence was the same as Giant Slalom, not standard Slalom. Gates were set at roughly the same distances as GS and on a slope of about the same pitch. The field of thirty-two were drawn following an invitational format. The top four men in the overall World Cup rankings were automatic invitees, if they chose to compete. Another 16 racers were selected from the top of the current GS start list rankings, and the final twelve competitors were selected from the 1st run efforts at the standard GS event the day prior at the same venue. Overlapping qualifications allowed the sponsors to invite lower ranked participants to fill in gaps, as needed, and to replace individuals who declined to participate. Points were awarded and accumulated according to current standards for the race season in all relevant categories: the GS discipline, Overall and Nations Cup. The field was filled with thirty-two first round participants, each getting a run on either course. The best combined times moved the fastest racer to the second round through bracket preference protocols. From the second round, skiers the head-to-head competitions were held over one run only, with the faster skier from the previous round granted course selection between the 'red-right' or 'blue-left' course. At about one-third the time of a standard GS event, top performers/finalists were able to make multiple runs without the fatigue of a longer event. The course was methodically set with lasers, and a GPS-equipped Snowcat, to guarantee that both courses on the hill were as identical as possible to ensure equity and a fair competition. The Race Director suggested the difference between the two lanes were within "1–to–2 centimeters" tolerance of one another.

Events

Various records

Men

Women

Twenty or more speed and technical wins

Speed events
As of 24 January 2023

NOTE: Super G not contested at that time.
NOTE: Parallel events are not included in the list as slalom wins.

Technical events
As of 24 January 2023

All-event winners 
Only a few racers have ever managed to win races in all five classic World Cup alpine skiing disciplines during their career, as listed in the table below. Marc Girardelli (1988–89), Petra Kronberger (1990–91), Janica Kostelić (2005–06) and Tina Maze (2012–13) are the only skiers to have won all five events in a single season. Bode Miller is the only skier with at least five World Cup victories in all five disciplines.

Men

Women 

Mikaela Shiffrin is the only skier in history who has won in six different disciplines—i.e., aside from the classic five disciplines, she has also won in parallel slalom.

Most race wins in a single season 
The following skiers have won at least ten World Cup races in a single season (events not available in a given season are marked "NA"):

Men

Women

Scoring system 

The World Cup scoring system is based on awarding a number of points for each place in a race, but the procedure for doing so and the often-arcane method used to calculate the annual champions has varied greatly over the years.  Originally, points were awarded only to the top ten finishers in each race, with 25 points for the winner, 20 for second, 15 for third, 11 for fourth, 8 for fifth, 6 for sixth, 4 for seventh, then decreasing by one point for each lower place.  To determine the winner for each discipline World Cup, only a racer's best three results count, from a typical six to eight races in each discipline. For the overall Cup, the best three results in each discipline are summed. Until 1970, also the results of Winter Olympic Games races and Alpine World Ski Championship races were included in the World Cup valuation (i.e. Grenoble 1968 and Val Gardena 1970); this was abandoned after 1970, mainly due to the limited number of racers per nation who are admitted to take part in these events. For the 1971–72 season, the number of results counted was increased to five in each discipline. The formula used to determine the overall winner varied almost every year over the next decade, with some seasons divided into two portions with a fixed number of results in each period counting toward the overall, while in other seasons the best three or four results in each discipline would count.

Starting with the 1979–80 season, points were awarded to the top 15 finishers in each race. After 1980–81, the formula for the overall title stabilized for several years, counting the best 5 results in the original disciplines (slalom, giant slalom, and downhill) plus the best three results in combined. When Super G events were introduced for the 1982–83 season, the results were included with giant slalom for the first three seasons, before a separate discipline Cup was awarded starting in 1985–86 and the top 3 Super G results were counted toward the overall. The formula for the overall was changed yet again the following season, with the top four results in each discipline counting, along with all combined results (although the combined was nearly eliminated from the schedule, reduced to one or two events per season).

This perennial tweaking of the scoring formula was a source of ongoing uncertainty to the World Cup racers and to fans.  The need for a complete overhaul of the scoring system had grown increasingly urgent with each successive year, and in 1987–88 the FIS decided to fully simplify the system: all results would now count in each discipline and in the overall.  This new system was an immediate success, and the practice of counting all results has been maintained in every subsequent season. With the ongoing expansion of the number and quality of competitors in World Cup races over the years, a major change to the scoring system was implemented in the 1991–92 season.  The top 30 finishers in each race would now earn points, with 100 for the winner, 80 for second, 60 for third, and then decreasing by smaller increments for each lower place.  The point values were adjusted slightly the following season (to reduce the points for places 4th through 20th), and the scoring system has not been changed again since that year. The table below compares the point values under all five scoring systems which have been in use:

† The scoring system changed during the 1978–79 season; this special system was used for the last two men's downhills and the last three races in every other discipline except combined.

Statistical analysis 
Since the Top 30 scoring system was implemented in 1991–92., the number of completed men's or women's World Cup races each year has ranged from 30 to 44, so the maximum possible point total for an individual racer is about 3000–4400 under the current scoring system. Very few racers actually ski in all events. Bode Miller is the only skier who competed in every World Cup race during the three seasons from 2003 to 2005. The current record for total World Cup points in a season is Tina Maze's 2414 points in 2012–13, with the men's record of 2000 points set by Hermann Maier in 1999–2000. The fewest points for an overall champion under the current system thus far have been 1009 for men by Aksel Lund Svindal in 2008–09 and 1248 for women by Vreni Schneider in 1994–95.  The largest margin of victory in the overall has been Maze's 1313 points in 2012–13, more than doubling second-place finisher Maria Höfl-Riesch's total, while the largest men's margin was 743 points by Hermann Maier in 2000–01. Note that in the early days of World Cup (when the first place was awarded only 25 points), even larger relative margins of victory were recorded in 1967 by Jean-Claude Killy with 225 points over Heinrich Messner with 114 points and in 1973–74 by Annemarie Moser-Pröll with 268 points over Monika Kaserer with 153 points. The closest finishes since 1992 have been minuscule margins of 6 points in 1994–95 (Vreni Schneider over Katja Seizinger), 3 points in 2004–05 (Anja Pärson over Janica Kostelić) and in 2010–11 (Maria Riesch over Lindsey Vonn), and only 2 points in 2008–09 (Aksel Lund Svindal over Benjamin Raich). The current men's record for total World Cup points in one month of the season is Ivica Kostelić's 999 points from January 2011.

The tables below contain a brief statistical analysis of the overall World Cup standings during the 21 seasons since the Top 30 scoring system was implemented in 1991–92.  In general, over 1000 points are needed to contend for the overall title.  At least 1 man and 1 woman has scored 1000 points in each of these seasons, but no more than 5 men's or women's racers have crossed that threshold in any single season.  Of the 42 men's and women's overall champions in these years, 38 scored over 1200 points, 30 had over 1300 points, 19 reached 1500 points, and only 7 amassed more than 1700 points during their winning seasons.  As for the runners-up, 37 of the 42 second-place finishers scored over 1000 points, 18 had over 1300 points, and only 4 reached 1500 points yet failed to win.  Most overall titles have been won quite convincingly, by more than 200 points in 23 of 42 cases, while only 11 margins of victory have been tighter than 50 points.

Finals 
Since 1993 the International Ski Federation (FIS) has hosted a World Cup Final at the end of each season in March. During five days, men's and women's races are held in four disciplines: slalom, giant slalom, Super G, and downhill, as well as a team event. Only a limited number of racers are invited to ski at the Finals, including the top 25 in the World Cup standings in each discipline, the current junior World Champions in each discipline, and any skiers with at least 500 points in the general classification. Because of the smaller field, World Cup points are only awarded to the top 15 finishers in each race.

Hosts

Winners by country 
The table below lists those nations which have won at least one World Cup race (current as of 19 March 2023).

Men

Women

Alpine team event 

Individual race wins are counted in this table, along with the nations team events held at World Cup Finals since 2006 (counts double as men and women in mixed competition contribute to a win). The "parallel race" is a head-to-head slalom race format used occasionally from the 1970s through 1990s, and again in 2011. Team event wins are doubled (because on one team event race competed both women and men; so it's counted separately each for women and men). Results for West Germany and Germany are counted together in this table.  All of Yugoslavia's wins are currently lumped in with Slovenia, since the skiers who won races for former Yugoslavia were all Slovenes from Slovenia (one of six Yugoslav Republics), and thus are listed under Slovenia in online databases. The Soviet Union and Russia are counted separately, as are Czechoslovakia and the Czech Republic.

A total of 24 countries have won World Cup races, with 19 countries winning men's races and 20 winning women's races. As expected, the top ten nations in this list are the ten nations listed in the Nations Cup summary table (with slight changes in order).

Marc Girardelli accounted for all of Luxembourg's 46 wins, while Janica Kostelić has 30 of Croatia's 56 and her brother Ivica has the rest. Ingemar Stenmark still has nearly one-half of Sweden's 192 wins more than two decades after his retirement. Some nations specialize in either speed (downhill and Super G) or technical (slalom and GS) disciplines, while others are strong across the board.  Among nations with 30+ wins, the Canadian team has won 73% of its races in speed events, while Yugoslavia/Slovenia has won 84% and Sweden 86% of their races in technical events, especially notable in Sweden's case given its large number of wins. Several nations with under 30 wins have 100% of them in technical events, led by Finland and Spain. In contrast Germany and Norway have the most even distribution without disproportionate strength or weakness in any one discipline. Some nations have strong teams in only one gender, as 92% of Norway's wins have come from their men and 83% of Germany's from their women, while the Swiss, French and Canadian totals are split almost equally.

Nations Cup

The Nations Cup standings are calculated by adding up all points each season for all racers from a given nation.

The total number of top-three placings for each nation in the Nations Cup (through the 2021–22 season) are summarized below:

Note: Results for West Germany and Germany are counted together in this table.

Crystal globe
Since 1967, the big crystal globe has been awarded for the overall title. From the beginning to 1971–72, discipline titles were awarded with medals. Statistically, those titles have the same value as the small crystal globes, which first appeared for discipline titles in slalom, giant slalom and downhill in the 1977–78. In super-G, the small globe has been awarded since 1985–86. For super-g races in the three seasons previous, points were added and calculated in the giant slalom ranking. In combined, the small crystal globe was officially awarded only between 2007-2012. Before that, combined season winners could not officially be considered as season titles. In those years FIS simply calculated points from the other two races, DH and SL.

See also
Other world competitions
Alpine skiing at the Winter Olympics
FIS Alpine World Ski Championships

Statistics
List of FIS Alpine Ski World Cup men's champions
List of FIS Alpine Ski World Cup women's champions
List of FIS Alpine Ski World Cup men's race winners
List of FIS Alpine Ski World Cup women's race winners
List of FIS Alpine Ski World Cup winners of men's discipline titles
List of FIS Alpine Ski World Cup winners of women's discipline titles
List of FIS Alpine Ski World Cup host
List of FIS Alpine Ski World Cup men's hosts
List of FIS Alpine Ski World Cup ladies' hosts
List of men's downhill races in the FIS Alpine Ski World Cup
List of FIS Alpine Ski World Cup races calendar
List of FIS Alpine Ski World Cup Nations Cup standings

References

External links

FisAlpine.com FIS Alpine World Cup – Official website
SkiWorldCup.org – History of the World Cup – by Serge Lang (see also ISHA: History of the World Cup)
FIS-ski.com – official results for FIS alpine World Cup events
Ski-db.com – World Cup results database
Alpine Canada Alpin/Canadian Alpine Ski Team
U.S. Ski and Snowboard Association
U.S. Ski Team
Podium places in the World Cup Women TOP 150
Podium places in the World Cup Men TOP 150

 
World Cup
Alpine
Recurring sporting events established in 1967
Skiing world competitions
Alpine skiing